Overconsumption describes a situation where a consumer overuses their available goods and services to where they can't, or don't want to, replenish or reuse them. In microeconomics, this may be described as the point where the marginal cost of a consumer is greater than their marginal utility. The term overconsumption is quite controversial in use and does not necessarily have a single unifying definition. When used to refer to natural resources to the point where the environment is negatively affected, is it synonymous with the term overexploitation. However, when used in the broader economic sense, overconsumption can refer to all types of goods and services, including manmade ones, e.g. "the overconsumption of alcohol can lead to alcohol poisoning". Overconsumption is driven by several factors of the current global economy, including forces like consumerism, planned obsolescence, economic materialism, and other unsustainable business models and can be contrasted with sustainable consumption.

Defining the amount of a natural resource required to be consumed for it to count as "overconsumption" is challenging because defining a sustainable capacity of the system requires accounting for many variables. The total capacity of a system occurs at both the regional and worldwide levels, which means that certain regions may have higher consumption levels of certain resources than others due to greater resources without overconsuming a resource.  A long-term pattern of overconsumption in any given region or ecological system can cause a reduction in natural resources that often results in environmental degradation. However, this is only when applying the word to human impacts on the environment. When used in an economic sense, this point is defined as when the marginal cost of a consumer is equal to their marginal utility. Gossen's law of diminishing utility states that at this point, the consumer realizes the cost of consuming/purchasing another item/good is not worth the amount of utility (a.k.a. happiness or satisfaction from the good) they'd receive, and therefore is not conducive to the consumer's wellbeing.

When used in the environmental sense, the discussion of overconsumption often parallels that of population size and growth, and human development: more people demanding higher qualities of living, currently requires greater extraction of resources, which causes subsequent environmental degradation such as climate change and biodiversity loss. Currently, the inhabitants of high wealth, "developed" nations consume resources at a rate almost 32 times greater than those of the developing world, who make up the majority of the human population (7.9 billion people). However, the developing world is a growing consumer market. These nations are quickly gaining more purchasing power and it is expected that the Global South, which includes cities in Asia, America, and Africa, will account for 56% of consumption growth by 2030. This means that if current trends continue relative consumption rates will shift more into these developing countries, whereas developed countries would start to plateau. Sustainable Development Goal 12 "responsible consumption and production" is the main international policy tool with goals to abate the impact of overconsumption.

Causes

Economic growth

Economic growth is sometimes seen as a driver for overconsumption. Economic growth can be seen as a catalyst of overconsumption due to it requiring greater resource input to sustain the growth. China is an example where this phenomenon has been observed readily. China’s GDP increased massively from 1978, and energy consumption has increased by 6-fold. By 1983, China’s consumption surpassed the biocapacity of their natural resources, leading to overconsumption. In the last 30–40 years, China has seen significant increases in its pollution, land degradation, and non-renewable resource depletion, which aligns with its considerable economic growth. It is unknown if other rapidly developing nations will see similar trends in resource overconsumption.

The Worldwatch Institute said China and India, with their booming economies, along with the United States, are the three planetary forces that are shaping the global biosphere. The State of the World 2005 report said the two countries' high economic growth exposed the reality of severe pollution. The report states that
The world's ecological capacity is simply insufficient to satisfy the ambitions of China, India, Japan, Europe, and the United States as well as the aspirations of the rest of the world in a sustainable way.

In 2019, a warning on the climate crisis signed by 11,000 scientists from over 150 nations said economic growth is the driving force behind the "excessive extraction of materials and overexploitation of ecosystems" and that this "must be quickly curtailed to maintain long-term sustainability of the biosphere." Also in 2019, the Global Assessment Report on Biodiversity and Ecosystem Services published by the United Nations' Intergovernmental Science-Policy Platform on Biodiversity and Ecosystem Services, which found that up to one million species of plants and animals are at risk of extinction from human activity, asserted that

A key element of more sustainable future policies is the evolution of global financial and economic systems to build a global sustainable economy, steering away from the current limited paradigm of economic growth.

Consumerism
Consumerism is a social and economic order that encourages the acquisition of goods and services in ever-increasing amounts. There is a spectrum of goods and services that the world population constantly consumes. These range from food and beverage, clothing and footwear, housing, energy, technology, transportation, education, health and personal care, financial services, and other utilities. When the resources required to produce these goods and services are depleted beyond a reasonable level, it can be considered to be overconsumption. Because developing nations are rising quickly into the consumer class, the trends happening in these nations are of special interest. According to the World Bank, the highest shares of consumption, regardless of income lie in food, beverage, clothing, and footwear. As of 2015, the top five consumer markets in the world included the United States, Japan, Germany, China, and France.

Planned and perceived obsolescence is an important factor that explains why some overconsumption of consumer products exists. This factor of the production revolves around designing products with the intent to be discarded after a short period of time. Perceived obsolescence is prevalent within the fashion and technology industries. Through this technique, products are made obsolete and replaced on a semi-regular basis. Frequent new launches of technology or fashion lines can be seen as a form of marketing-induced perceived obsolescence. Products designed to break after a certain period of time or use would be considered to be planned obsolescence.

Affluence

According to a 2020 paper written by a team of scientists titled "Scientists' warning on affluence", the entrenchment of "capitalist, growth-driven economic systems" since World War II gave rise to increasing affluence along with "enormous increases in inequality, financial instability, resource consumption and environmental pressures on vital earth support systems." And the world's wealthiest citizens, referred to as "super-affluent consumers . . . which overlap with powerful fractions of the capitalist class," are the most responsible for environmental impacts through their consumption patterns worldwide.

Any sustainable social and environmental pathways must include transcending paradigms fixated on economic growth and also reducing, not simply "greening", the overconsumption of the super-affluent, the authors contend, and propose adopting either reformist policies which can be implemented within a capitalist framework such as wealth redistribution through taxation (in particular eco-taxes), green investments, basic income guarantees and reduced work hours to accomplish this, or looking to more radical approaches associated with degrowth, eco-socialism and eco-anarchism, which would "entail a shift beyond capitalism and/or current centralised states."

Effects

A fundamental effect of overconsumption is a reduction in the planet's carrying capacity. Excessive unsustainable consumption will exceed the long-term carrying capacity of its environment (ecological overshoot) and subsequent resource depletion, environmental degradation and reduced ecosystem health. In 2020 multinational team of scientists published a study, saying that overconsumption is the biggest threat to sustainability. According to the study, a drastic lifestyle change is necessary for solving the ecological crisis. According to one of the authors Julia Steinberger: “To protect ourselves from the worsening climate crisis, we must reduce inequality and challenge the notion that riches, and those who possess them, are inherently good.” The research was published on the site of the World Economic Forum. The leader of the forum professor Klaus Schwab, calls to a "great reset of capitalism".

A 2020 study published in Scientific Reports, in which both population growth and deforestation were used as proxies for total resource consumption, warns that if consumption continues at the current rate for the next several decades, it can trigger a full or almost full extinction of humanity. The study says that "while violent events, such as global war or natural catastrophic events, are of immediate concern to everyone, a relatively slow consumption of the planetary resources may be not perceived as strongly as a mortal danger for the human civilization." To avoid it humanity should pass from a civilization dominated by the economy to a "cultural society" that "privileges the interest of the ecosystem above the individual interest of its components, but eventually in accordance with the overall communal interest."

The scale of modern life's overconsumption can lead to a decline in economy and an increase in financial instability. Some argue that overconsumption enables the existence of an "overclass", while others disagree with the role of overconsumption in class inequality. Population, Development, and Poverty all coincide with overconsumption; how they interplay with each other is complex. Because of this complexity it is difficult to determine the role of consumption in terms of economic inequality.
 
In the long term, these effects can lead to increased conflict over dwindling resources and in the worst case a Malthusian catastrophe. Lester Brown of the Earth Policy Institute, has said: "It would take 1.5 Earths to sustain our present level of consumption.  Environmentally, the world is in an overshoot mode."

As of 2012, the United States alone was using 30% of the world's resources and if everyone were to consume at that rate, we would need 3-5 planets to sustain this type of living. Resources are quickly becoming depleted, with about ⅓ already gone. With new consumer markets rising in the developing countries which account for a much higher percentage of the world's population, this number can only rise. According to Sierra Club’s Dave Tilford, "With less than 5 percent of world population, the U.S. uses one-third of the world’s paper, a quarter of the world’s oil, 23 percent of the coal, 27 percent of the aluminum, and 19 percent of the copper." According to BBC, a World Bank study has found that "Americans produce 16.5 tonnes of carbon dioxide per capita every year. By comparison, only 0.1 tonnes of the greenhouse gas is generated in Ethiopia per inhabitant."

A 2021 study published in Frontiers in Conservation Science posits that aggregate consumption growth will continue into the near future and perhaps beyond, largely due to increasing affluence and population growth. The authors argue that "there is no way—ethically or otherwise (barring extreme and unprecedented increases in human mortality)—to avoid rising human numbers and the accompanying overconsumption", although they do say that the negative impacts of overconsumption can perhaps be diminished by implementing human rights policies to lower fertility rates and decelerate current consumption patterns.

Effects on health 
A report from the Lancet Commission says the same. The experts write: "Until now, undernutrition and obesity have been seen as polar opposites of either too few or too many calories," "In reality, they are both driven by the same unhealthy, inequitable food systems, underpinned by the same political economy that is single-focused on economic growth, and ignores the negative health and equity outcomes. Climate change has the same story of profits and power,". Obesity was a medical problem for people who overconsumed food and worked too little already in ancient Rome, and its impact slowly grew through history. As to 2012, mortality from obesity was 3 times larger than from hunger, reaching 2.8 million people per year by 2017

Overuse of artificial energy, for example, in cars, hurts health and the planet. Promoting active living and reducing sedentary lifestyle, for example, by cycling, reduces greenhouse gas emissions and improve health

Global estimates 
In 2010, the International Resource Panel published the first global scientific assessment on the impacts of consumption and production. The study found that the most critical impacts are related to ecosystem health, human health and resource depletion. From a production perspective, it found that fossil-fuel combustion processes, agriculture and fisheries have the most important impacts. Meanwhile, from a final consumption perspective, it found that household consumption related to mobility, shelter, food, and energy-using products causes the majority of life-cycle impacts of consumption.

According to the IPCC Fifth Assessment Report, human consumption, with current policy, by the year 2100 will be seven times bigger than in the year 2010.

Footprint

The idea of overconsumption is also strongly tied to the idea of an ecological footprint.  The term "ecological footprint" refers to the "resource accounting framework for measuring human demand on the biosphere."  Currently, China, for instance, has a per person ecological footprint roughly half the size of the US, yet has a population that is more than four times the size of the US.  It is estimated that if China developed to the level of the United States that world consumption rates would roughly double.

Humans, their prevailing growth of demands for livestock and other domestic animals, has added overshoot through domestic animal breeding, keeping, and consumption, especially with the environmentally destructive industrial livestock production. 
Globalization and modernization have brought Western consumer cultures to countries like China and India, including meat-intensive diets which are supplanting traditional plant-based diets. Between 166 to more than 200 billion land and aquatic animals are consumed by a global population of over 7 billion annually. A 2018 study published in Science postulates that meat consumption is set to increase as the result of human population growth and rising affluence, which will increase greenhouse gas emissions and further reduce biodiversity. Meat consumption needs to be reduced in order to make agriculture sustainable by up to 90% according to a 2018 study published in Nature.

Ecological footprint for many years has been used by environmentalists as a way to quantify ecological degradation as it relates to an individual. Recently, there has been debate about the reliability of this method.

Counteractions
The most obvious solution to the issue of overconsumption is to simply slow the rate at which materials are becoming depleted. From a capitalistic point of view, less consumption has negative effects on economies and so instead, countries must look to curb consumption rates but also allow for new industries, such as renewable energy and recycling technologies, to flourish and deflect some of the economic burdens. Some movements think that a reduction in consumption in some cases can benefit the economy and society. They think that a fundamental shift in the global economy may be necessary to account for the current change that is taking place or that will need to take place. Movements and lifestyle choices related to stopping overconsumption include: anti-consumerism, freeganism, green economics, ecological economics, degrowth, frugality, downshifting, simple living, minimalism, the slow movement, and thrifting.

Many consider the final target of the movements as arriving to a steady-state economy in which the rate of consumption is optimal for health and environment.

Recent grassroots movements have been coming up with creative ways to decrease the number of goods we consume. The Freecycle Network is a network of people in one's community that are willing to trade goods for other goods or services. It is a new take on thrifting while still being beneficial to both parties.

Other researchers and movements such as the Zeitgeist Movement suggest a new socioeconomic model which, through a structural increase of efficiency, collaboration and locality in production as well as effective sharing, increased modularity, sustainability and optimal design of products, are expected to reduce resource-consumption.
Solutions offered include consumers using market forces to influence businesses towards more sustainable manufacturing and products.

Another way to reduce consumption is to slow population growth by improving family planning services worldwide. In developing countries, more than 200 million women do not have adequate access. Women's empowerment in these countries will also result in smaller families.

See also

Energy crisis
Artificial demand
Collaborative consumption
Conspicuous consumption
Consumption (economics)
Degrowth
Effects of the car on societies
Environmental studies
Externality
The Limits to Growth
Mottainai
Overexploitation
Overshoot (population)
Peak copper
Peak oil
Planet of the Humans (film)
Preorder economy
Santosha (renunciation of the need to acquire)
Steady-state economy
Surplus: Terrorized into Being Consumers (film)
World Scientists' Warning to Humanity

References

Further reading

 Fifty Possible Ways to Challenge Over-Commercialism by Albert J. Fritsch, SJ, PhD
 Why people hate fat Americans by Daniel Ben-Ami

External links
 Mother Pelican A journal of sustainability
 Optimum Population Trust
 UN Division for Sustainable Development, Agenda 21, Chapter 4 – "Changing Consumption Patterns"
 Footprint For Nations
 The Story of Stuff (video)
 Energy statistics-Oil Consumption by Country
 World Energy Use Graph
 Global GDP by Country
 

Consumerism
Waste minimisation
Peak oil
Population ecology
World population
Global issues
Environmental controversies
Environmental social science concepts